House of Cards is a 1968 American neo-noir crime film directed by John Guillermin and starring George Peppard, Inger Stevens, and Orson Welles. Filmed in France and Italy, it marked the third time that Peppard and Guillermin worked together (they had previously collaborated on the 1966 film The Blue Max) then PJ.
 
The film was first released in the United Kingdom in November 1968, but was not released in the United States until the following September.

Plot
Reno Davis is an American writer who has recently retired from boxing. Now unemployed and broke in France, he encounters the wealthy widow of a French general. Anne de Villemont is attracted to Reno, and he to her, but she keeps him at arm's length. She also hires him to tutor her eight-year-old son Paul. The real reason she wants Reno is for protection.

Reno is led to believe that Anne's husband was killed in the Algerian conflict, and he is troubled by Anne's intense fear that Paul will be kidnapped. He then discovers the family has ties to a fascist organization that plans to take over all of Europe. He takes on the shady psychiatrist Morillon and mysterious family friend Leschenhaut, both of whom frighten Anne whenever they are around.

Reno is framed for his best friend's murder as he and Anne become the targets of the ambitious and maniacal schemers who wish to rule Europe. Reno and Anne are hunted around France while protecting Paul from being abducted. The chase ends at the Colosseum in Rome, where Reno and the villains engage in a showdown.

Cast

Production
The film was based on a novel by Stanley Ellin. In May 1966, before the novel had been published, Universal announced that it would produce a film adaptation. By October 1966, the film had Dick Berg as producer and Irving and Harriet Ravetch as writers. The novel was issued in 1967. The Los Angeles Times called it "superb."

George Peppard was cast in July 1967. Eva Renzi's casting was announced in August. That same month, John Guillermin signed on to direct what would be his third film with Peppard.

Shooting
Filming started in August 1967 in Paris. Shortly into filming, Renzi withdrew for personal reasons and was replaced by Inger Stevens. In September, the unit moved to Rome.

During filming, Peppard joked that the film should be called The Running Jumping and Never Standing Still Film.

Reception
The Los Angeles Times called House of Cards "a mildly diverting so-so adventure movie that could have been so much better."

Home media
This film has never been released in North America on VHS or DVD, though it has been released on DVD in France (Bach Films, 2007), Germany (Mondo Entertainment, 2009) and Italy (Sinister Film, 2013).

See also
List of American films of 1969

References

External links
 
 
 
 

1968 films
1960s mystery films
1960s crime thriller films
American mystery thriller films
American crime thriller films
Films directed by John Guillermin
Films based on American novels
Films set in Paris
Films set in Rome
Films scored by Francis Lai
Films shot in Paris
Films shot in Rome
1960s English-language films
1960s American films